The Conant Creek Pegram Truss Railroad Bridge, in Fremont County, Idaho near Grainville, Idaho and Ashton, Idaho, was built in 1894.  It brought a railroad over the Conant Creek, 1 mile south of the junction of Squirrel Rd. and the old Ashton-Victor railroad spur tracks.  It is a Pegram truss bridge, designed by George H. Pegram.  It was listed on the National Register of Historic Places in 1997.

It now carries the Ashton-Tetonia Trail, and is known as the Conant Creek Trestle.

The towers, fabricated in 1911 by the American Bridge Company.

It was built in 1911 with Pegram spans that had been fabricated in 1894 by the Union Bridge Company of New York, and had been used previously at a Snake River crossing at American Falls, Idaho.  The trusses were reinforced in 1916 with an additional, similar span along the centerline, manufactured by the American Bridge Company.  In 1927 the steel girders were put into place, replacing original 1911 timber Howe trusses;  these girders are believed to have been fabricated by Paxton & Verling Iron Works.

The rails were removed when the line was abandoned, several years before the 1997 National Register listing.

References

Rail trail bridges in the United States
Truss bridges
Pegram trusses
Bridges in Idaho
National Register of Historic Places in Fremont County, Idaho
Buildings and structures completed in 1894